Marc Landry Babo (born 13 March 1991) is an Ivorian professional footballer who currently plays as a winger or a forward  for Thai League 1 club Police Tero.

External links
https://int.soccerway.com/players/marc-landry-babo/129364/
https://web.archive.org/web/20160427094208/http://thaipremierleague.co.th/ld12014.php
https://web.archive.org/web/20150227145420/http://thaipremierleague.co.th/2015/l1scorers.php
https://web.archive.org/web/20190214200330/https://www.thaileague.co.th/official/?r=News%2FNewsRead&id=1684
https://www.thaileague.co.th/official/?r=Match/ShowResult&tournament_id=2
https://www.thaileague.co.th/official/t2/?r=Tournament/TopScorer&iTournamentID=2&iRegionID=0
https://www.thaileague.co.th/official/t2/?r=Tournament/TopScorer&iTournamentID=2&iRegionID=0
http://player.7mth.com/333112/index.shtml

1991 births
Ivorian footballers
Expatriate footballers in Thailand
Marc Landry Babo
Marc Landry Babo
Marc Landry Babo
Marc Landry Babo
Marc Landry Babo
Ivorian expatriate sportspeople in Thailand
Association football forwards
Living people